Red Frog Events, LLC was a privately owned (one-member LLC with Joe Reynolds as the sole member) event production company founded in 2007 and based in Chicago, Illinois. The company's events and services included Warrior Dash, Firefly Music Festival, ShamrockFest, American Beer Classic, EventSprout, and Red Frog Food and Beverage. Joe Reynolds and Ryan Kunkel were the co-CEOs.

History

Mirroring the television show The Amazing Race, Joe Reynolds organized and launched Great Urban Race, LLC, and hosted the first race on September 15, 2007 in Chicago.

In December 2008, Reynolds brought on four event coordinator interns ("Tadpoles") and moved the business into an office in Chicago's Lincoln Park neighborhood to help keep up with the planning and organizing of Great Urban Race. In 2009, Ryan Kunkel joined Reynolds to expand Great Urban Race and develop new events.

In the summer of 2009 the company was renamed Red Frog Events, LLC, and the first Warrior Dash was held in Joliet, Illinois. In 2010, Red Frog Events moved from the Lincoln Park office to the current location at 320 West Ohio Street.

On November 13, 2010, the first Beach Palooza (later rebranded as Beach Dash to maintain consistency with the Warrior Dash race series) was held at Daytona Beach, Florida. In 2011, Red Frog Bar Crawls were launched. The first event, a Halloween costume bar crawl called Nightmare on Clark Street, occurred on October 15, 2011 in Chicago. Snow Day in Washington D.C. was the next in the series, on December 17. Two more bar crawls were introduced in 2012: Bright 'N' Tight in San Diego, California, and Derby Days in Charlotte, North Carolina.

In 2012 the Firefly Music Festival was launched in Dover, Delaware, and Farm to Fork, a "farm style dinner," took place on September 22 at McDonald Farm in Naperville, Illinois.

In 2013 Red Frog launched three new running events: Iron Warrior Dash, Urban Warrior Dash, and Illuminite Run. It also launched the American Beer Classic beer festival and the Candy Cane Express.

In 2014, Red Frog launched the Bacon Chase in Atlanta, Georgia on March 22, 2014. It also bought DC-based ShamrockFest from GoCity Events and began offering its ticketing platform, EventSprout, to third-party event organizers.

In 2015, Red Frog Events launched Big Barrel Country Music Festival and bought DJ's National Food Services which was renamed to Red Frog Food and Beverage.

On July 21, 2015, Red Frog laid off 29 of its roughly 105 employees.

In Aug 2019, Red Frog Events ceased to operate.

Events

Runs 

Warrior Dash - a 5k mud race with 12 obstacles. Since the inaugural race in 2009, more than 2.5 million people have competed in Warrior Dash.
Great Urban Race - an urban scavenger hunt held in cities across the United States. In a typical race, teams solve twelve clues and complete a variety of tasks while exploring the city. In 2011, there were 37 U.S. qualifying races, and qualifying races in Australia and Canada. The championship race was held on November 12, 2011 in New Orleans, Louisiana. There were a total of 21 races across the country in 2012, with the championship race held in Las Vegas, Nevada on November 10.
 The Beach Dash (formerly Beach Palooza) - a 5K race with 12 obstacles along a beach. Red Frog Events has hosted 11 Beach Dash runs across the nation. Because of low registration numbers in the US, Red Frog sold the event name and concept to an Australian events company in 2012.
Iron Warrior Dash - a longer (12+ mile) version of the Warrior Dash race series.
 Urban Warrior Dash was an urban version of the Warrior Dash race series that takes place downtown in major metropolitan areas.
 Illuminite Run was a nighttime run featuring lights and EDM music.
The Bacon Chase was a 5k and .05k un-timed run that features bacon at the water checkpoints and at the finish line.

Festivals 

 Firefly Music Festival is a music festival in Dover, Delaware. It lasts four days and features musical performances, dining, and entertainment at the Dover International Speedway, which is transformed into a festival area featuring seven stages. The 2012 lineup featured The Killers, Jack White, The Black Keys, John Legend, The Flaming Lips, OK Go, Young the Giant, and Cake. Since 2012, Firefly has had headliners Paul McCartney, Foo Fighters, Tom Petty and the Heartbreakers, Kings of Leon, and Red Hot Chili Peppers. In 2018, AEG Presents bought Firefly Music Festival and continues to produce the festival annually.
 Big Barrel Country Music Festival took place over three days in Dover, Delaware. The first and only year of the event was 2015. Red Frog Events and Goldenvoice partnered to produce and promote the country festival. Headliners were Blake Shelton, Miranda Lambert, and Carrie Underwood. The Festival was cancelled in 2016.
 American Beer Classic was a beer festival that takes place on Chicago’s Soldier Field. The festival began in 2013 and features hundreds of beers. In late 2015, the event was rebranded to Chicago Beer Classic with a heightened focus on Chicago breweries.
 ShamrockFest was a large St. Patrick's Day festival that takes place in Washington, D.C. It features live music, games, Irish food and an Irish market.

Bar crawls 

 Nightmare on Clark Street, Chicago, Illinois
 Snow Day, Washington, D.C.
 Bright 'N' Tight, San Diego, California
 Derby Days in Charlotte, North Carolina

Other 

 Farm to Fork was a farm dinner in Naperville, Illinois. The inaugural Farm to Fork featured chef and Chicago native, Valerie Bolon. Farm to Fork took place on September 22 at Naperville's McDonald Farm, which is also home to The Conservation Foundation as well as the Green Earth Institute.
 Candy Cane Express was a holiday-themed train ride through various parts of the Chicago area, featuring milk and cookies.

Platforms and services 

 EventSprout was an online registration platform. Red Frog began developing the system in 2009 and now offers it to third party events.
 Red Frog Food and Beverage was a food and beverage operation service formed when Red Frog acquired long time partner DJ’s National Food Service in 2015.

Awards
 The company was selected as St. Jude Children's Research Hospital's "Corporate Partner of the Year" and committed to raise $25 million for the organization to open the St. Jude Red Frog Events Proton Therapy Center. As of January 2019, Red Frog had only raised $15.5 million of their $25 million commitment. 
 U.S. Chamber of Commerce Small Business of the Year
 Chicago Tribune Top Workplace
 Chicago Innovation Award
 Inc. 5000, Inc. Magazine, #9
 Outside Magazine Best Places to Work, #16
 Forbes Most Promising Company in America, #18
 101 Best and Brightest Companies to Work For

Closure 
On July 31, 2019, Red Frog events announced their closure and ceased operations.

References

Event management companies of the United States
2007 establishments in Illinois
2019 disestablishments in Illinois